Mikita Sviryd (born 25 June 1996) is a Belarusian judoka.

He is the silver medallist of the 2018 Judo Grand Prix The Hague and is scheduled to participate for Belarus at the 2020 Summer Olympics.

References

External links
 

1996 births
Living people
Belarusian male judoka
Judoka at the 2019 European Games
Judoka at the 2020 Summer Olympics
Olympic judoka of Belarus
21st-century Belarusian people